Billia is a genus of trees in the family Sapindaceae and native to the Americas, from central Mexico to Ecuador. The wood is used in carpentry.

Species 
The following species are recognized:

 Billia hippocastanum
 Billia rosea

References

Further reading 

Hippocastanoideae
Sapindaceae genera
Taxa named by Johann Joseph Peyritsch